In information security, risk factor is a collective name for circumstances affecting the likelihood or impact of a security risk.

Definitions

FAIR 

Factor Analysis of Information Risk (FAIR) is devoted to the analysis of different factors influencing IT risk. It decompose at various levels, starting from the first level Loss Event Frequency and Probable Loss Magnitude, going on examining the asset, the threat agent capability compared to the vulnerability (computing) and the security control (also called countermeasure) strength, the probability that the agent get in contact and actually act against the asset, the organization capability to react to the event and the impact on stakeholders.

ISACA 
Risk factors are those factors that influence the frequency and/or business impact of risk scenarios; they can be of different natures, and can be classified in two major categories:

 Environmental, further subdivided in:
 Internal environmental factors are, to a large extent, under the control of the enterprise, although they may not always be easy to change.
 External environmental factors are, to a large extent, outside the control of the enterprise.
 Capability of the organization, further subdivided in:
 IT risk management capabilities—To what extent is the enterprise mature in performing the risk management processes defined in the Risk IT framework
 IT capabilities—How good is the enterprise at performing the IT processes defined in COBIT
 IT-related business capabilities (or value management)—How closely do the enterprise’s value management activities align with those expressed in the Val IT processes

Risk scenario 
An IT risk risk scenario is a description of an IT related event that can lead to a business impact, when and if it should occur.

Risk factors can also be interpreted as causal factors of the scenario that is materialising, or as vulnerabilities or weaknesses. These are terms often used in risk management frameworks.

Risk scenario is characterized by:
 a threat actor that can be:
 Internal to the organization (employee, contractor)
 External to the organization (competitor, business partner, regulator, act of god)
 a threat type
 Malicious,
 Accidental
 Failure
 Natural
 Event
 Disclosure,
 Modification
 Theft
 Destruction
 Bad design
 ineffective execution
 inappropriate use
 asset or resource
 People and organization
 Process
 Infrastructure or facilities
 IT infrastructure
 Information
 Application
 Time
 Duration
 Timing of occurrence (critical or not)
 Timing to detect
 Timing to react

The risk scenario structure differentiates between loss events (events generating the negative impact), vulnerabilities or vulnerability events
(events contributing to the magnitude or frequency of loss events occurring), and threat events (circumstances or events that can trigger loss
events). It is important not to confuse these risks or throw them into one large risk list.

See also 

 Asset
 Attack (computing)
 Countermeasure (computer)
 Computer security
 Computer insecurity
 Information Security
 Information security management
 ISACA
 Information security management system
 ISO/IEC 27001
 IT risk
 Risk
 Risk Management
 The Open Group
 Threat (computer)
 Security control
 Security risk
 Security service (telecommunication)
 Vulnerability (computing)

References 

Computer security
Risk analysis